Alanah Pearce (born 24 August 1993) is an Australian video game writer and former journalist. Since 2020, Pearce has worked for American game developer Santa Monica Studio.

Pearce has reported on video games for various news outlets including entertainment news website IGN. She worked at production company Rooster Teeth from 2018 to 2020, during which she hosted the Inside Gaming news program and was involved with its Funhaus division, which produces videos focused on video games.

Early life and education 
Alanah Pearce was born in Cairns, Queensland, Australia, on 24 August 1993. Pearce was raised in Cairns, and later spent nine years in Brisbane. From a young age, she was interested in writing and video games, doing reviews of video games in her diaries. While working at a call center, she found a job listing for a volunteer games journalist position that inspired a career in journalism. She earned a bachelor's degree studying mass communication at the Queensland University of Technology in Brisbane.

Career

Journalism 
From 2012 to 2015, Pearce wrote gaming news for around a dozen news outlets, including Impulse Gamer, Zelda Universe, the BBC, and worked stints at Australian radio and television stations. She launched a YouTube channel in 2012, where she publishes game reviews and personal videos.

Feeling the Australian video game industry was too small, Pearce moved to the United States in 2015. She began work as an editor and writer for IGN later that year. In 2017, she replaced Naomi Kyle as host of IGNs Daily Fix gaming news program. Later that year, she was involved in a staff walkout until the company issued a statement addressing sexual harassment allegations made by former editor Kallie Plagge. Pearce cohosted the SXSW Gaming Awards alongside Rich Campbell in 2018.

After departing IGN in 2018, Pearce joined production company Rooster Teeth. She regularly appeared in videos for Funhaus, a division of Rooster Teeth which produces videos focused on video games, and cohosted the company's Inside Gaming news program starting in 2019. She left Rooster Teeth in October 2020.

Game development 
In November 2020, Pearce joined Sony's Santa Monica Studio as a video game writer. She provided consulting on three video games and completed other work on two video games prior to joining the studio. She faced harassment on social media following the studio's decision to delay the release of God of War Ragnarök. In September 2021, Pearce revealed that she was part of the development team behind Ragnarök.

Pearce did voice acting for Gears 5 (2019) and Afterparty (2019). She also lent her voice and likeness to a character in Cyberpunk 2077 (2020).

Podcasting 
Pearce is the host of the Play, Watch, Listen podcast, along with Troy Baker, Mike Bithell, and Austin Wintory. She also hosts the podcasts Red Lips, Orange Car and Video Game Writing 101, and formerly hosted Idiots and a Broad. She was a founding host of the Kinda Funny Xcast, but left the show several months after its premiere due to scheduling conflicts with her new job at Sony Santa Monica.

Personal life 
Pearce credits video games with helping her deal with the effects of myalgic encephalomyelitis and tendinitis. She has helped fundraise for AbleGamers, a charity dedicated to improving accessibility in video games. In November 2020, she cohosted the inaugural Video Game Accessibility Awards with AbleGamers.

In 2014, Pearce became the focus of news media after she wrote to the mothers of internet trolls who had sent her rape threats. In 2019, she was subject to harassment after the Entertainment Software Association, the organiser of the E3 gaming expo, leaked the personal information of E3 2019 media attendees to the public.

Pearce came out in June 2020; while she does not feel an attachment to any label, she felt best defined by the term pansexual.

Awards and nominations

References

External links 

1993 births
21st-century Australian journalists
21st-century LGBT people
Australian expatriate journalists in the United States
Australian video game designers
Australian voice actresses
Australian women journalists
Australian LGBT writers
Australian LGBT journalists
Living people
Pansexual women
People from Cairns
Queensland University of Technology alumni
Video game writers
Women in the video game industry
Women video game designers
Women video game developers